Platon Chirnoagă (October 24, 1894 – March 29, 1974) was a Romanian brigadier-general during World War II.

Chirnoagă was born in 1894 in Poduri, Bacău County, one of eight children of  Gheorghe Chirnoagă, a teacher, and his wife, Olimpia; one of his brothers, Eugen Chirnoagă, became a chemist.

He attended military school from 1913 to 1915, graduating with the rank of second lieutenant. He then fought in World War I in Transylvania and Moldavia, and was promoted to lieutenant in 1917. In 1919 he 
fought in the Hungarian–Romanian War, advancing to the rank of captain. From 1923 to 1925 he attended the Higher War School; he was promoted to major (1926), lieutenant colonel (May 1934), and then colonel (February 1939).

In 1941, Chirnoagă was Chief Operation 3rd Army and then Vice Chief of Staff 3rd Army. He became Commanding Officer 7th Artillery Regiment and subsequently Vice Chief of Staff 3rd Army in 1942. In January 1944, he was promoted to brigadier general. Later that year, he was Commanding Officer 4th Artillery Brigade, General Officer Commanding 4th Division, and finally a German prisoner. In 1945, Chirnoagă was Minister of Defence while in exile in Nazi Germany.

On 8 May 1945 he was arrested and interned at the Glasenbach camp, an Allied POW camp near Salzburg where members of Nazi organizations and war criminals were held. He was freed in April 1947, after which he lived in Austria. A CIA report from May 1949 identified Chirnoagă as a member of the Iron Guard, who had close contacts with Horia Sima. He later moved to France, and published his war memoirs in 1965. After 1968 he went to Stuttgart, where he died in 1974.

References

Romanian Land Forces generals
Romanian military personnel of World War II
1894 births
1974 deaths
Romanian military personnel of World War I
People from Bacău County
Romanian people of the Hungarian–Romanian War
Romanian prisoners of war
Members of the Iron Guard
Carol I National Defence University alumni
Knights of the Order of the Crown (Romania)
Officers of the Order of the Star of Romania